Self-Portrait is an oil on canvas self-portrait by the Venetian painter Titian, dated c. 1546–47. While he painted a number of independent self-portraits in various formats, this is one of only two painted examples to survive. The other is in Madrid, dated c. 1560. Both share a   somber and reserved palette, although this example is richer in tonal variation and colour harmonisation. 

It is unfinished, with his left hand, areas of his clothing only sketched and only roughly sketched. It has been suggested that the canvas is a modello, or study, for another now lost work. Another theory is that it was painted for family members for his memory after he died.

Thematically and stylistically, the work can be associated with his 1545 Portrait of Pietro Aretino. A number of versions or variants exist, including drawings from his own hand, and paintings attributed to his workshop.

Origin and purpose
Parts of the canvas are unfinished, especially the hands, the dark area around his face, and the drapery. It remained in Titian's studio in the Biri Grande, Venice, until his death, which some art historian see as evidence that it was intended as a study, although it may just have been simply because it was unfinished.

The Italian painter, architect, and writer Giorgio Vasari wrote in 1568 that Titian had made a number of self-portraits for his family to remember him by, and it is likely that this was one, given that it was not sold in his lifetime. However Vasari dates the portrait to c. 1562–64, this work more closely corresponds to a records of a version of a portrait given to Paolo Giovio in 1549.

Description
The painting's style is reminiscent of Titian's work of around 1560, especially the thick and irregular application of white paint in large sections.  He seems to be around 60 years old, giving credence to the earlier dating. He wears the golden chain of the Order of the Golden Spur, wrapped in three strands, which was given to him by the Emperor Charles V in 1533. The chain is intended to signify his knighthood and elevated social status. He wears a black cap in both paintings; a motif seen a number of other of his later works. While the origins of the motif are unknown, it is probably intend to connect him with scholarship; similar headgear is often associated with Aristotle and St Jerome. A further explanation is that he sough to cover up a bald spot.  

The portrait is in half length, with Titian in three-quarters profile view, seated behind a table, looking out into the distance. Although his expression is complex and hard to properly interpret, it can be viewed as a more outward looking and optimistic expression the 1567 Madrid self-portrait, and a number of art historians note the aging and physical decline he had undergone by the time of the later work. As with all of his independent self-portraits, he is looking to the side, avoiding the viewer, possibly out of humility, but in a dignified pose. He is shown with strong shoulders and a keen, alert gaze, in which some detect an air "of combativeness...disquietude...and misgiving". 

Unlike the Madrid canvas, the portrait does not refer to his occupation as a painter, although art historian David Rosand believes that "instead of an implement of his craft, however, the open brushwork itself declares the painter's art". Further, the emphasis on his hands may reference that as a painter his talent derived from them.
  
That the canvas is unfinished gives insight into Titian's working methods and techniques.

Provenance
The painting was acquired by the Gemäldegalerie, Berlin from the English Solly collection in the early 1820s.

References

Notes

Sources

Jaffe, David, et al. In: Titian. London: National Gallery London, 2003. 
Kaminski, Marion. Titian. Ullmann, 2007. 
Nichols, Tom. "Titian and the End of the Venetian Renaissance". Reaktion Books, 2013.  
Partridge, Loren. "Art of Renaissance Venice, 1400 1600". University of California Press, 2015.  
Phillips, Claude. Titian. New York: Parkstone, 2016. 
Richter, George Martin. "Two Titian Self-Portraits". The Burlington Magazine for Connoisseurs, Vol. 58, No. 337, 1931
Rosand, David. "Titian Draws Himself".  Artibus et Historiae, Vol. 30, No. 59, 2009
Tsaneva, Maria. "Titian: 130 Paintings and Drawings". Lulu Press, 2014.  

1540s paintings
Titian
Titian, Berlin
Paintings in the Gemäldegalerie, Berlin
Titian, Berlin
Unfinished paintings